Pierre Brassard (born April 24, 1966) is a French-Canadian actor, comedian, television personality, and radio broadcaster. He is associated with CKOI-FM in Montreal and known for his phone call hoaxes.

In one publicized incident, Brassard, thinly disguised as a television reporter, encountered former Canadian prime minister Pierre Elliott Trudeau at the 1993 Montreal Film Festival. After Brassard asked a series of absurd questions, Trudeau ripped off Brassard's fake beard, slapped the prankster in the face, and aimed a kick at his groin.

In 2021 he was a competitor on Chanteurs masqués, the Quebec adaptation of the Masked Singer franchise. He sang Les B.B.'s "Fais attention" in costume as a speckled trout, but was the second person eliminated from the competition.

References

External links
Pierre Brassard on IMDb

1966 births
Living people
Male actors from Montreal
Canadian radio hosts
Canadian male television actors
Place of birth missing (living people)
Canadian television hosts
French Quebecers
Comedians from Montreal